Loayza or José Ramón Loayza is a province in the La Paz Department, Bolivia. Its seat is Luribay.

Geography 
The Kimsa Cruz mountain range traverses the province. Some of the highest mountains of the province are listed below:

Subdivision 
The province is divided into five municipalities which are further subdivided into cantons.

See also 
 Chillwa Quta
 Jach'a Jawira
 Malla Jawira
 Warus Quta

References 

Provinces of La Paz Department (Bolivia)